Malý Horeš is a village and municipality in the Trebišov District in the Košice Region of south-eastern Slovakia.

History
In historical records the village was first mentioned in 1214.

Geography
The village lies at an altitude of 103 metres and covers an area of 19.21 km².
It has a population of about 1115 people.

Ethnicity
The village has population of 1 112 people. 
Ethnicities are as follows: 93,4 percent Hungarian, 5,4 percent Slovak and 1,2 percent unknown/not recorded, based on records from 2011.

Facilities
The village has a public library and a football pitch

References

External links
https://www.webcitation.org/5QjNYnAux?url=http://www.statistics.sk/mosmis/eng/run.html

Villages and municipalities in Trebišov District
Zemplín (region)
Hungarian communities in Slovakia